Vagina Obscura: An Anatomical Voyage is a 2022 non-fiction book written by science journalist Rachel E. Gross and illustrated by Armando Veve.

Summary 
Vagina Obscura uses cultural historical and medical approaches to explore female anatomy. Gross' historical account begins in ancient Greece with Hippocrates. Gross also includes personal experience in her book, writing about endometriosis and having a bacterial infection in her vagina.

Development 
Gross initially titled the book Lady Anatomy.

Reception 
The book has been shortlisted for the 2023 Andrew Carnegie Medal for Excellence in Nonfiction.

References 

2022 non-fiction books
English-language books
Feminism and health
American non-fiction books
Health and wellness books
Feminist books
W. W. Norton & Company books